Perspective is an adult romance drama directed by Bree Mills. The film was edited into two versions an R-Rated film available for digital download, stream or DVD purchase, as well as an uncut pornography style film available for digital and hard copy purchase. The film was praised by those in the adult and mainstream market.

The film received dozens of nominations from major award associations such as AVN, XBIZ and XRCO.

Plot 
Daniel and Jennifer are a young married couple with different wants and needs emotionally, professionally as well as sexually. Daniel and Jennifer explore these needs behind each other's back. The struggle of the two main characters ambitions get the best of them as they get competitive to stay together.

Cast 

 Angela White as Jennifer
 Seth Gamble as Daniel
 Michael Vegas as Dr. Mercer
 Whitney White as Girl #1
 Abigail Mac as Girl #2
 Gianna Dior as Girl #3
 Derrick Pierce as Aaron
 Eric Masterson as Guy #1
 JJ Graves as Guy #2
 Isiah Maxwell as Guy #3

Reception 
Perspective has received rave reviews from critics. Porn critics rated the film as the best of 2019 and one of the best of the decade. Mainstream reviews questioned the story line as many last scolding reviews.

The film was nominated for over a dozen industry awards winning a handful. The film was nominated for six AVN Awards and won a show best three awards at the 37th AVN Awards show. It also won an award at the XBIZ Awards and was nominated for ten more.

Awards and nominations

References

External links 

 

2019 films
American pornographic films
2010s pornographic films
2010s English-language films
2010s American films